Strathfield Girls High School is a single-sex comprehensive high school located in the municipality of Strathfield in Sydney, New South Wales, Australia, along with its brother school, Homebush Boys High School.

History
The school opened as Homebush Intermediate High School, founded in 1926. In 1953, it was established as Strathfield Girls High School, and became known as a languages high school (due to the rich cultural diversity and backgrounds of its students) in 1990. Over 85% of its students are from non-English speaking backgrounds.

Campus
The school has a "Hockey Field"  and a "Quad" where students often gather during lunchtimes and breaks. There is a "Senior area" restricted to Year 12 students. A staff common room exists in the northern part of the campus. The school also has two out door tennis/basketbal/netball courts and one gym. The layout of the school is in a rectangular shape with all the buildings named according to the direction that they are facing, there is the North block, South block, East block, West block, West West block and Centre block.

Extracurricular activities
Opportunities provided at the school include entering competitions in writing, public speaking, debating, art, drama, the sciences, mathematics, problem solving and mock trials. The school also conducts a school choir and orchestra, drama ensembles, Musicale, and Dance Night where students from Dance groups and students studying Dance as either an elective or for their HSC, exhibit what they have been working on throughout the year. There is also a Student Representative Council and many community service programs, such as a tree planting group who plant and look after trees in the school. Soccer, touch football, netball, cricket, basketball, badminton and softball are offered as sports.

Notable alumni
Janice Crosio

See also 
 List of Government schools in New South Wales

References

External links
 Strathfield Girls High website

Girls' schools in New South Wales
Public high schools in Sydney
Educational institutions established in 1953
1953 establishments in Australia
Strathfield, New South Wales